Christmas Hills is a rural locality in the local government area (LGA) of Circular Head in the North-west and west LGA region of Tasmania. The 2016 census recorded a population of 115 for the state suburb of Christmas Hills.

History 
Christmas Hills was gazetted as a locality in 1973. 

It is believed that the area was first “discovered” by Europeans on Christmas Day.

Geography
The Duck River forms a small part of the eastern boundary. Many of the boundaries are survey lines.

Road infrastructure 
Route A2 (Bass Highway) runs through from north-east to north-west.

References

Towns in Tasmania
Localities of Circular Head Council